Aljaž Bedene was the defending champion but chose to compete in the 2013 Aegon Championships instead.
Mikhail Kukushkin won the title defeating Damir Džumhur in the final, 6–4, 1–6, 6–2.

Seeds

Draw

Finals

Top half

Bottom half

References
 Main Draw
 Qualifying Draw

Kosice Openandnbsp;- Singles
2013 Singles